Captain Roi Edgerton "Tug" Wilson, CBE, DFC (1 June 1921 – 17 March 2009) was a Royal Navy officer and Master of the Royal Caledonian Schools.

Early life
He was educated at Old Swinford Hospital, Stourbridge then worked in an engineering company before volunteering for the Royal Navy.

References

Telegraph obituary of Captain Roi Wilson

1921 births
2009 deaths
British military personnel of the Indonesia–Malaysia confrontation
Commanders of the Order of the British Empire
Recipients of the Distinguished Flying Cross (United Kingdom)
Royal Navy officers of World War II
People educated at Old Swinford Hospital
People from Stourbridge
Royal Navy personnel of the Korean War
British military personnel of the Malayan Emergency
Military personnel from Worcestershire